HMS Argenta (originally the American cargo ship SS Argenta) was a prison ship of the British Royal Navy.

Construction
The two deck steamer was laid down in July 1917 by the National Shipbuilding Company of Orange, Texas as Hull No. 245. Shortages of materials meant that she was wooden-hulled, with a steel keelson, stem and stern posts of oak, and timbers largely of yellow pine. This was due to shortages of metals. SS Argenta was launched in May 1919.

Cargo ship
Argentas career as a cargo ship was short. As early as November 1919, there were some signs of leakage, and the ship was out of service from late 1921. Condemned and declared unseaworthy in May 1922, she was then sold for use as a prison ship (a prison hulk) by the British Royal Navy.

Prison ship 
During the 1920s, the vessel was used by the British government as a military base and prison ship for holding Irish Republicans as part of Britain's internment strategy following the events of Bloody Sunday in 1920. In the spring of 1922 the Irish Republican Army (IRA) launched an offensive in Northern Ireland (see The Troubles in Northern Ireland (1920–1922)) resulting in the internment of many Irish Republicans on the Argenta. 

Dawson Bates, the 1st Northern Ireland Minister for Home Affairs introduced the 1922 Special Powers Act.  Internment was introduced and by May 1922 up to 700 Irish Republicans had been arrested. By February 1923, 263 men interned on the Argenta, which was moored in Belfast Lough near Carrickfergus. This location was supplemented with internments at other land based sites, such as Larne workhouse, Belfast Prison and Derry Gaol. The ship and the workhouses held 542 men without trial at the highest internment population level (June 1923).

Conditions on the Argenta were "unbelievable", according to Denise Kleinrichert who wrote the hidden history of the 1920s' "floating gulag" in Republican Internment and the Prison Ship Argenta, 1922. Cloistered below decks in cages which each held 50 internees, the prisoners were forced to use broken toilets, which overflowed frequently into their communal area. Deprived of tables, the already weakened men ate off the floor, frequently succumbing to disease and illness as a result. Internees suffered routine beatings from guards and health issues from the conditions on board the ship. Six men were discharged from the ship with medical conditions and two died soon afterwards. There were several hunger strikes, including a major strike involving upwards of 200 men in the winter of 1923 (see 1923 Irish hunger strikes). 

In November 1923 IRA leader Seamus Woods was arrested and charged with the assassination of a member of the new Northern Parliament (W.J. Twaddell - May 22, 1922) and held on the Argenta. Although Woods was acquitted of the Twaddell murder charge he continued to be held and was the last prisoner to be released from the ship (17 April 1924). Woods was then served with a prohibition order which excluded him from Northern Ireland. Another notable internee was Cahir Healy, an Irish politician who campaigned against the inclusion of Counties Tyrone and Fermanagh  into Northern Ireland as they had Irish nationalist majorities. Healy spent 18 months on the Argenta, starting in July 1922. Healy is quoted on the reasons for his arrest and internment, "All my life, I have been a man of peace. It is not, therefore, because they feared that I would disturb the peace of Northern Ireland that they dragged me away from my wife and family, but for political reasons. I have been engaged in preparing the case for the inclusion of these areas (Fermanagh and Tyrone) in the Free State. To get me out of the way, local politicians urged my arrest". 

In 2011 a rare and unusual autograph book from the Argenta, with a large number of signatures of prisoners, almost all with Northern Ireland addresses, mostly late 1922, was auctioned by Mealys Rare Books Limited. Signatures include Mícheál mac Eochaidh, W. Quillan, Packie Murphy, J.P. Kearns, Michael Carraher, Charlie Magee, Peter Rafferty, Mick McIlhatton, Frankie Corr, Owen (Montague) Teague (Patrilineality; County Tyrone, Northern Ireland,) John Grimes, John Bell, Joseph McKenny, Michael O'Neill, Liam Ua Donngaile, Art Mac Partolon (quoting Shakespeare), F.G. Duffy, Jim Rooney, Seosamh O Cianain and Patrick Gormley.

An inscription from the book reads

As a result of author Denise Kleinrichert's lobbying efforts, the files of all the internees — most of them named in an appendix to her book — are now available for viewing at the Public Record Office of Northern Ireland (PRONI).

See also
HMS Al Rawdah (1941)

References

Further reading

External links
 Internment on the Prison Ship Argenta
 Abandoned on the Argenta — US author's tribute to prison ship victims
 Ship Building History
 Irish Census 1911; Owen (Teague) Montague, County, Tyrone

1919 ships
Defunct prisons in Northern Ireland
Prison ships
History of Belfast
Internment camps
Internment camps in the United Kingdom